Slammiversary is a professional wrestling pay-per-view (PPV) event produced by the American promotion Impact Wrestling. It is one of Impact's “Big Four” PPV events (along with Hard to Kill, Rebellion, and Bound for Glory), and celebrates the anniversary of the promotion's first event that was held on June 19, 2002. 

The event had been held in July since 2017; the 2022 event took place on June 19 – twenty years to the day of the promotion's first ever event.

History

King of the Mountain
Slammiversary's signature match was the King of the Mountain match, a five-man reverse ladder match which was previously contested for the NWA World Heavyweight Championship and, later, the TNA World Heavyweight Championship. The match debuted on the June 2, 2004, edition of Impact's (then known as NWA:TNA) weekly pay-per-views in Nashville, Tennessee, and has been featured at all Slammiversary events up until the 2010 edition. The match made its return in 2015, where the newly announced TNA King of the Mountain Championship was on the line to crown the inaugural champion.

Events

References

External links
ImpactWrestling.com